Helen Frost (born 12 March 1974) is a British sprinter. She competed in the women's 4 × 400 metres relay at the 2000 Summer Olympics.

References

External links
 

1974 births
Living people
Athletes (track and field) at the 2000 Summer Olympics
British female sprinters
Olympic athletes of Great Britain
Place of birth missing (living people)
Commonwealth Games medallists in athletics
Commonwealth Games silver medallists for England
Athletes (track and field) at the 2002 Commonwealth Games
Olympic female sprinters
Medallists at the 2002 Commonwealth Games